Virbia pallicornis is a moth in the family Erebidae. It was described by Augustus Radcliffe Grote in 1867. It is found on Cuba.

References

Moths described in 1867
pallicornis
Endemic fauna of Cuba